The 2014 NCHC Tournament was the first tournament in league history. It was played between March 13 and March 22, 2014. Quarterfinal games were played at home team campus sites, while the final four games were played at the Target Center in Minneapolis, Minnesota. By winning the tournament, Denver received the NCHC's automatic bid to the 2014 NCAA Division I Men's Ice Hockey Tournament.

Format

The tournament features three rounds of play. In the quarterfinals the first seed and eighth seed, the second seed and seventh seed, the third seed and sixth seed and the fourth seed and fifth seed play a best-of-three series with the winners advancing to the semifinals. After the opening round every series becomes a single-elimination game. In the semifinals, the highest and lowest remaining seeds and second highest and second lowest seeds are matched against one another with the winners advancing to the championship game and the loser advancing to the third place game. The tournament champion receives an automatic bid to the 2014 NCAA Division I Men's Ice Hockey Tournament.

Regular season standings
Note: GP = Games played; W = Wins; L = Losses; T = Ties; SOW = Shootout Wins; PTS = Points; GF = Goals For; GA = Goals Against

Bracket
Teams are reseeded after the Quarterfinals

* denotes overtime periods

Results

Quarterfinals

(1) St. Cloud State vs. (8) Miami

(2) North Dakota vs. (7) Colorado College

(3) Nebraska-Omaha vs. (6) Denver

(4) Minnesota-Duluth vs. (5) Western Michigan

Semifinals

(2) North Dakota vs. (8) Miami

(5) Western Michigan vs. (6) Denver

Third place

(2) North Dakota vs. (5) Western Michigan

Championship

(6) Denver vs. (8) Miami

Tournament awards

All-Tournament Team
F Daniel Doremus* (Denver)
F Ty Loney (Denver)
F Anthony Louis (Miami)
D Joey LaLeggia (Denver)
D Nolan Zajac (Denver)
G Sam Brittain (Denver)
* Most Valuable Player(s)

References

External links
 2014 NCHC Men's Ice Hockey Tournament

NCHC Tournament
National Collegiate Hockey Conference Tournament